Xianghuo may refer to:

Incense (film), a 2003 Chinese film
The Descendant, a 2012 Malaysian TV series